is a railway station in Fukuyama, Hiroshima Prefecture, Japan, operated by West Japan Railway Company (JR West).

Lines
Higashi-Fukuyama Station is served by the Sanyō Main Line.

See also
 List of railway stations in Japan

External links
  

Railway stations in Hiroshima Prefecture
Sanyō Main Line
Railway stations in Japan opened in 1966